Biedouw Valley (where Biedouw is a surname) is a valley situated in the Western Cape province of South Africa at an elevation of 376 m. It is located near Pakhuis Pass, between Clanwilliam and Uitspankraal.

References 

Landforms of the Western Cape
Valleys of South Africa